Jens Luedecke is an East German rower. He won a gold medal at the 1987 World Rowing Championships in Copenhagen with the men's coxless four, and became world champion in the same boat class for a second time in 1989.

References

Year of birth missing (living people)
East German male rowers
World Rowing Championships medalists for East Germany
Living people